Geraldo Rafael Perdomo (born October 22, 1999) is a Dominican professional baseball shortstop for the Arizona Diamondbacks of Major League Baseball (MLB).

Career
Perdomo signed with the Arizona Diamondbacks as an international free agent in July 2016. He made his professional debut in 2017 with the Dominican Summer League Giants, batting .238 with one home run and 11 RBIs over 63 games. In 2018 he played for the Arizona League Diamondbacks, Missoula Osprey and Hillsboro Hops, slashing a combined .322/.438/.460 with four home runs, 24 RBIs, and 24 stolen bases over 57 games.

Perdomo started 2019 with the Kane County Cougars and was promoted to the Visalia Rawhide during the season. Over 116 games between both clubs, Perdomo hit .275 with three home runs, 47 RBIs, and 26 stolen bases. After the season, he played in the Arizona Fall League and was selected to play in the Falls Stars Game.

Perdomo did not play a minor league game in 2020 due to the cancellation of the minor league season caused by the COVID-19 pandemic. The Diamondbacks added him to their 40-man roster after the 2020 season. On April 3, 2021, Perdomo was promoted to the major leagues to fill in for the injured Nick Ahmed. He made his MLB debut that night, filling in for Josh Rojas at shortstop.

On June 7, 2022, he hit his first career home run, a grand slam, against Jared Solomon of the Cincinnati Reds.

In 2022 he tied (along with Tomás Nido) for the major league lead in sacrifice hits with 12, and batted .195/.285/.262 in 462 at bats.

References

External links

1999 births
Living people
Amarillo Sod Poodles  players
Arizona Diamondbacks players
Arizona League Diamondbacks players
Dominican Republic expatriate baseball players in the United States
Dominican Summer League Diamondbacks players
Hillsboro Hops players
Kane County Cougars players
Major League Baseball players from the Dominican Republic
Major League Baseball shortstops
Missoula Osprey players
Reno Aces players
Salt River Rafters players
Sportspeople from Santo Domingo
Visalia Rawhide players